Bernhard Buttersack (16 March 1858, Bad Liebenzell — 6 May 1925, Icking) was a German landscape painter of the Munich School.

Life and work
He displayed artistic talent at an early age, was encouraged by his parents and began his studies at the Royal Art School in Stuttgart under Jakob Grünenwald and Albert Kappis. Upon completing his course there, he became a master pupil of Hermann Baisch and Gustav Schönleber in Karlsruhe. He worked in Munich from 1884 to 1889 and was soon  appointed a Royal Professor by the Prince Regent Luitpold. In 1891, he was awarded a Gold Medal at the Glaspalast and, the following year, was one of the founders of the Munich Secession.

Towards the end of 1889, he moved to Dachau County, inspired by the dramatic landscapes there. Four years later, after several moves, he settled in Haimhausen, where he built a spacious house with a large art studio and landscaped garden. He soon opened a private art school and began what became the Haimhausen Art Colony.

In his later years, however, he suffered from an unspecified "nervous ailment", which was difficult to define. The joy he felt for the local surroundings gradually diminished and he complained about the frequent easterly winds which, he said, ruined the picturesque atmosphere. In 1914, he moved to Icking and became a recluse.

References

Further reading 
 Ottilie Thiemann-Stoedter: Die Malerkolonie Haimhausen. In: Amperland. Jg. 10, 1974, pp. 518–527.
 Lorenz Josef Reitmeier: Dachau der berühmte Malerort. Munich 1990.

External links 

 Entry for Bernhard Buttersack on the Union List of Artist Names

1858 births
1925 deaths
People from Calw (district)
People from the Kingdom of Württemberg
German landscape painters
19th-century German painters
German male painters
20th-century German painters
20th-century German male artists
19th-century German male artists